The following is a season-by-season list of people who have worked on Seattle Mariners local radio and television broadcasts.

Current broadcast team
Rick Rizzs (1983–1991, 1995–present)
Dave Sims (2007–present)
Mike Blowers (2007–present)
Aaron Goldsmith (2013–present)
Alex Rivera (Spanish language, 2007–present)

Former Broadcast team
Ken Brett (1986)
Nellie Briles (1985)
Jay Buhner (2002–2005, 2011–2012)
Chip Caray (1993–1997)
Julio Cruz (Spanish language, 2002–2021)
Ron Fairly (1993–2006, 2011–2012)
Bill Freehan (1979–1980)
Greg Gumbel (1991)
Dave Henderson (1997–2006, 2011–2012)
Ken Levine (1992–1994, 2011–2012)
Dave Niehaus (1977–2010)
Tom Paciorek (2001)
Amaury Pi-Gonzalez (Spanish language, 2003–2006)
Don Poier (1981)
Billy Sample (1992)
Joe Simpson (1987–1991)
Wes Stock (1982–1983)
Dave Valle (1997–2006, 2011–2012)
Dan Wilson (2011–2012)
Ken Wilson (1977–1982, 2011–2012)

Radio broadcasts

Since 2009, and from 1985-2002 the Mariners' flagship radio station is KIRO 710 AM. Former flagship stations include KOMO 1000 AM (2003–2008) and KVI 570 AM (1977–1984).

Television broadcasts
Root Sports Northwest (FSN formerly Northwest Cable Sports and Prime Sports Northwest; 1993–present)
KSTW 11 (CW formerly Independent and UPN; 1981–1985, 1989–1992, 2001–2007)
KIRO-TV 7 (CBS formerly UPN; 1986–1988, 1990–1991, 1995–2000)
KING-TV 5 (NBC; 1977–1980)

Radio Broadcasters by year

2020s

2000s & 2010s

See also
 List of current Major League Baseball broadcasters

 
Seattle Mariners
Broadcasters
Prime Sports
Fox Sports Networks
AT&T SportsNet